Adam "Tex" Davis is an American screenwriter and director. He is most famous for writing the scripts for Spring Break Lawyer and Just Friends. He is married to Kim Davis and has a daughter named Gia. He also worked on the National Geographic show, Brain Games.

Filmography
 Aloha Santa (Writer, 2016)
 Just Friends (written by / as Adam Davis) 2005
 Spring Break Lawyer (TV movie) (written by) 2001
 Off the Hook (TV movie) (co-cinematographer)1999
 The Eden Myth 1999
 Brokers 1997
 Monster Island (TV movie) 2004

References

External links
 

Living people
American male screenwriters
Year of birth missing (living people)